Francis Boisson (22 January 1928 – 23 December 2021) was a Monegasque sports shooter. He competed at the 1960 Summer Olympics and the 1972 Summer Olympics. Boisson died in December 2021, at the age of 93.

References

External links
 

1928 births
2021 deaths
Monegasque male sport shooters
Olympic shooters of Monaco
Shooters at the 1960 Summer Olympics
Shooters at the 1972 Summer Olympics